Agent Binky: Pets of the Universe is a Canadian computer-animated television series by Nelvana. Based on the Kids Can Press graphic novel series by Ashley Spires, the series premiered on Treehouse TV in Canada on September 7, 2019.

The series follows the adventures of Binky, a space cat who is on a mission to protect his human family (Big Human and Small Human) from any interstellar threats, with assistance from four pets in the P.U.R.S.T. (Pets of the Universe Ready for Space Travel) agency.

Characters
 Binky (voiced by Jesse Camacho) – A black and white cat and the leader of the P.U.R.S.T. agents. He has a purple toy mouse named "Ted" and has a purple sweater called "Fuzzy Wuzzy".
 Gordon (voiced by Paul Braunstein in Season 1 and David Menkin in Season 2-3) – A dog who lives with Binky and his family. He likes inventing things.
 Captain Gracie (voiced by Aurora Browne) – A brown-greyish cat who lives next door to her teammates.
 Nola (voiced by Melody A. Johnson) – A turtle who loves seashells.
 Loo (voiced by Boyd Banks) – A goldfish who is quite a bit grumpy.
 Sergeant Fluffy Vandermere (voiced by Dan Chameroy) – A Persian cat who is the boss and leader of P.U.R.S.T.
 Big Human (voiced by Katie Griffin) is the mother of Small Human.
 Small Human (voiced by Tyler James Nathan in Season 1, and Jacob Soley in Season 2) is the son of Big Human.
Chirpy McChirp is an evil villainous budgie who was rescued by Small Human in "Who's the WURST" and is shown unable making/getting it into integrating the ranks of the protectors and traps the team outside the station in order to take possession of all of Gordon's gadgets.
Amelia (voiced by Julie Lemieux) – A bat who first appeared in The Room of Many Boxes.
Mini Human (voiced by Isabella Leo) – The daughter of Tall Human.
Tall Human (voiced by Jonathan Tan) – The father of Mini Human.
Darrell (voiced by Zachary Bennett) - A hamster who is Fluffy's son.
New Backup Human – The agents' babysitter who substituted for Backup Human in "Adventures in Pet-Sitting".
Gobble (voiced by Richard Binsley) - A robot Gordon invented in "Gobble's Gotta Go".
Additional voices - Taylor Abrahamse, David Berni, Neil Crone, Stacey DePass, Dwayne Hill, Rebecca Husain, Nissae Isen, Tajja Isen, Bryn McAuley, Scott McCord, Terry McGurrin (also a story supervisor), Annick Obonsawin, Grant Palmer, Dan Petronijevic, Cara Pifko, Jacqueline Pillon, Joe Pingue, Erin Pitt, Andrew Sabiston, Robert Tinkler, Breanna Yde and Drew Adkins.

Production 
On September 19, 2018, it was announced that Nelvana would adapt the Kids Can Press graphic novel series "Binky the Space Cat" by Ashley Spires into an animated television series titled "P.U.R.S.T. Agent Binky". Agent Binky: Pets of the Universe was picked up for 52 11-minute episodes (often broadcast as 26 22-minutes) and was set to be released in 2019. The following February, it was revealed that the series was retitled to Agent Binky: Pets of the Universe, making it one of the first produced by redknot, a joint venture between Nelvana and Discovery Communications to produce content for Canada, Latin America and the rest of the world.

On January 7, 2021, Agent Binky: Pets of the Universe was renewed for a second season of another 52 11-minute episodes. The second season premiered in 2022.

Episodes
The first season consists of 26 22-minute episodes.

Season 1 (2019-2020)
Season 2

1.Up Up and away/Roundy Round up

Broadcast 
Agent Binky: Pets of the Universe premiered on Treehouse TV in Canada on September 7, 2019, and later that year in the US on High-Tech Kids Channel. The show currently airs every day at 12:40 PM and 7:30 PM, and some interstitial episodes air on the channel as well. The show also airs on Discovery Kids in Latin America, TF1 in France and Boomerang across Europe. In Singapore, it debuted on Channel 5 on June 15, 2020. In the United Kingdom, it debuted on Tiny Pop on June 21, 2021.

In French Canada, the show premiered on ICI Radio-Canada Télé on September 19, 2020.

References

External links 

2010s Canadian animated television series
2020s Canadian animated television series
2010s Canadian children's television series
2020s Canadian children's television series
2019 Canadian television series debuts
2020 Canadian television series endings
Canadian children's animated space adventure television series
Canadian preschool education television series
Animated preschool education television series
2010s preschool education television series
2020s preschool education television series
English-language television shows
Treehouse TV original programming
Canadian television shows based on children's books
Television series by Nelvana
Television series by Corus Entertainment
Animated television series about cats
Canadian computer-animated television series